Andrew John Ridgeley (born 26 January 1963) is an English singer, songwriter, musician and record producer, best known for his work in the 1980s in the musical duo Wham!.

Early life
Ridgeley was born in Windlesham, Surrey, England, to parents Jennifer John (née Dunlop) (1943-2009) and Alberto Mario Zacharia (who later changed his surname to Ridgeley)(1933-2015); his mother is of English and Scottish descent  and his father is of Italian and Egyptian descent. Ridgeley grew up in Bushey, Hertfordshire, and attended Bushey Meads School. His mother was a schoolteacher at Bushey Heath Primary School while his father worked for Canon. When George Michael enrolled at school, Ridgeley volunteered to take him under his wing.

Career 
After years of playing in various music groups, most notably The Executive, Michael and Ridgeley formed the duo Wham! in 1981. Michael was the lead vocalist, primary songwriter, and played keyboards, while Ridgeley co-wrote songs, played guitar, and performed backing vocals. They approached various record labels with a homemade demo tape–which took 10 minutes to record in Ridgeley's living room–and signed with Innervision Records (distributed by CBS Records). After one album, the duo signed with Epic Records/CBS.

Wham!

Wham! enjoyed worldwide success from 1982 to 1986, selling more than 35 million records worldwide. They made their U.S. debut on Dick Clark's American Bandstand, becoming the only 1980s British act to have three No. 1 singles on both the U.K. and U.S. charts.

In 1984, Ridgeley underwent surgery to have his septum straightened to improve his breathing after having broken his nose as a child of nine. After photos were published in British newspapers showing Ridgeley's bandaged face, Wham!'s manager, Simon Napier-Bell, fabricated a story that the bandages were the result of Ridgeley having been hit in the nose in a nightclub. After days of tabloid headlines, the true reason was revealed.

In 1984, Wham! charted two U.K. No. 1 singles, and were competing that year with pop rivals Duran Duran to be Britain's biggest pop act. Toward this end, Napier-Bell devised a publicity scheme that he believed would turn them into major international stars: In April 1985, he took Wham! to China for a 10-day visit. They gained huge worldwide media attention when Wham! became the first Western pop group to play in China, first in Hong Kong for two warm-up shows, then a show in Beijing in front of 15,000 people at the Worker's Gymnasium, and finally, one show in Canton. The visit was recorded for a documentary film titled Wham! in China: Foreign Skies. In 1985, Ridgeley performed at the Live Aid charity concert with other backing singers, while Michael performed with Elton John.

By 1985, Ridgeley had developed a reputation in the tabloid press as a drunken party animal at nightclubs; the British tabloids referred to him as "Animal Andy" and "Randy Andy". He was ordered to leave the official party at the end of the Live Aid concert in 1985 for his wild behaviour.

In 1986, "The Edge of Heaven" became Wham!'s fourth and final U.K. No. 1 single. With Michael keen to move into a more adult market, the duo broke up after a farewell concert dubbed "The Final" in front of 72,000 people at Wembley Stadium on Saturday, 28 June 1986.

Post-Wham!
Shortly after the breakup, Ridgeley moved to Monaco and tried his hand at Formula Three motor racing. Meeting with little success, he moved to Los Angeles in pursuit of a career in acting. He returned to Britain permanently in 1990.

CBS Records (later Sony Music), having taken up the option on Wham!'s contract that specified solo albums from Michael and Ridgeley, released a guitar- and drum-driven solo recording from Ridgeley, Son of Albert, in 1990. His brother Paul, an occasional percussionist for Bananarama, played drums on the album. The first single from the album was "Shake"; it reached No. 16 on the Australian singles chart and No. 58 in the UK Singles Chart. "Shake" was the 81st highest-selling single of 1990 in Australia. The second single, "Red Dress", charted in Australia but peaked outside the top 100. Son of Albert sold poorly, failing to make the top 75 in the UK Albums Chart. It was also one of the worst received albums of 1990 among critics, achieving only half a star in a savage Rolling Stone magazine review. As a result, CBS passed up the option of a second album. Ridgeley later said, "It was disappointing and depressing to receive quite such a beating over that album."

On 27 January 1991, Ridgeley joined Michael on stage for a few songs at the encore of his Rock in Rio event at the Maracanã Stadium in Rio de Janeiro.

Since 1991, Ridgeley has generally shunned publicity, but he did agree to give an on-camera interview for the first time since the split in a 2005 documentary, A Different Story, about the life of George Michael. Ridgeley also appeared as a studio guest on the first series of the BBC 2 programme Fantasy Football League in 1994.

In 2005, Ridgeley and Michael made plans to reunite as Wham! for Live 8, but Ridgeley reportedly pulled out at the last minute. In 2012, Michael dismissed rumours that they were set for a reunion to mark the 30th anniversary of their first record. Michael said that there was no truth in speculation the group would reform for a one-off concert.

Upon hearing of Michael's death on 25 December 2016, Ridgeley paid his respects on Twitter, saying, "Heartbroken at the loss of my beloved friend Yog."

Ridgeley performed a cameo role in Last Christmas, a 2019 film that featured many songs by Wham!.

Since 1982, Ridgeley has reportedly amassed £10 million from sales and royalties of records. Much of his income comes from the 1984 single "Careless Whisper", which he co-wrote (or, as reported, George Michael actually named Ridgeley as co-writer despite not contributing to the song) , and that has sold six million copies worldwide and, as of 2020, was the 37th best-selling single of all time in the United Kingdom, having sold over 1.3 million copies. Ridgeley still receives tens of thousands of pounds a year from his share of Wham! royalties as a member of the act and as a songwriter on some of the duo's songs.

Charitable work
Ridgeley has several times participated in the Dallaglio Cycle Slam, a charity bike ride for the Dallaglio Rugby Works, established in 2009 by former England rugby captain Lawrence Dallaglio, which helps young people tackle life in a positive way with the help of rugby.

Personal life
From 1990 to 2017, Ridgeley was in a relationship with Keren Woodward, a member of the group Bananarama. They lived with her son in a restored 15th-century farm property near Wadebridge, Cornwall, England. In 2022, Ridgeley began dating socialite Amanda Cronin.

Memoir
On 8 October 2019, Penguin Random House published Ridgeley's memoir Wham! George & Me.

Discography

Solo 
 Son of Albert (1990)

with Wham! 

 Fantastic (1983)
 Make It Big (1984)

References

External links

 

1963 births
Living people
English expatriates in Monaco
English expatriates in the United States
English male guitarists
English male singers
English people of Egyptian descent
English people of Italian descent
English people of Scottish descent
English rock guitarists
English songwriters
Columbia Records artists
Epic Records artists
Lead guitarists
Musicians from Hertfordshire
People educated at Bushey Meads School
People from Bushey
People from Surrey Heath (district)
Wham! members
English autobiographers
British male songwriters
English racing drivers
David Price Racing drivers
German Formula Three Championship drivers
French Formula Three Championship drivers